The Child Ballads are 305 traditional ballads from England and Scotland, and their American variants, anthologized by Francis James Child during the second half of the 19th century. Their lyrics and Child's studies of them were published as The English and Scottish Popular Ballads. The tunes of most of the ballads were collected and published by Bertrand Harris Bronson in and around the 1960s.

History

Age and source of the ballads

The ballads vary in age; for instance, the manuscript of "Judas" dates to the thirteenth century and a version of "A Gest of Robyn Hode" was printed in the late fifteenth or early sixteenth century. The majority of the ballads, however, date to the seventeenth and eighteenth centuries. Although some are claimed to have very ancient influences, only a handful can be definitively traced to before 1600. Moreover, few of the tunes collected are as old as the words. Nevertheless, Child's collection was far more comprehensive than any previous collection of ballads in English.

Many of Child's ballads were obtained from printed broadsides, but he generally distinguished the "traditional" ballads that interested him from later broadside ballads. As Child died before writing a commentary on his work, it is uncertain exactly how and why he selected some ballads and discounted others.

Editorial history

Child's collection was not the first of its kind; there had been many less scholarly collections of English and Scottish ballads, particularly from Bishop Thomas Percy's Reliques of Ancient English Poetry (1765) onwards. There were also "comprehensive" ballad collections from other countries. Child modelled his work on Svend Grundtvig's Danmarks gamle Folkeviser, classifying and numbering the ballads and noting different versions, which were placed side by side to aid comparison. As a result, one Child number may cover several ballads, which Child considered variants of the same story, although they may differ in many ways (as in "James Hatley"). Conversely, ballads classified separately may contain turns of phrase, and even entire verses, that are identical.

The editorial history of Child's publication received a monograph study by Mary Ellen Brown in 2011.

Bibliographic history

In 1860, Child published an eight-volume collection entitled English and Scottish Ballads, generally presenting just one variant of each ballad, via Little, Brown and Company. However, as a scholarly edition this was superseded by his later and similarly named The English and Scottish Popular Ballads.

The first edition of Child's book was, once complete, The English and Scottish Popular Ballads, ed. by Francis James Child, 5 vols (Boston and New York: Houghton, Mifflin and Company, [1882–98]).

It was printed in one thousand copies, and issued in ten parts, each with a half-title and title page. The final title pages for each of the five volumes, printed in red and black, were issued with part 10. Part 10 emerged after Child's death, and was edited by George Lyman Kittredge. Volume 5 contained a variety of scholarly apparatuses: the "Glossary" (V, pp. [309]-396); "Sources of the texts of the English and Scottish ballads" (V, pp. [397]-404); "Index of published airs of English and Scottish popular ballads, with an appendix of some airs from manuscript" (V, pp. [405]-424); "Index of ballad titles" (V, pp. [425]-453); "Titles of collections of ballads, or of books containing ballads" (V, pp. [455]-468); and "Index of matters and literature" (V, pp. [469]-502).

The book was reprinted, this time physically in three volumes, in 1957 by the New York-based Folklore Press, in association with the Pageant Book Company. It was reprinted again in 1965 in New York by Dover, this time with an essay by Walter Morris Hart entitled 'Professor Child and the Ballad' (reprinted from Publications of the Modern Language Association of America, vol. 21 [N.S. Vol. 14, no. 4]).

Child's edition was also the basis for a number of shorter, popular editions, prominently including English and Scottish Popular Ballads Edited from the Collection of Francis James Child, ed. by Helen Child Sargent and George Lyman Kittredge (Boston: Houghton-Mifflin, 1904).

Subjects of the ballads

Child Ballads are generally heavier and darker than is usual for ballads.  Some of the topics and other features characteristic enough of Child Ballads to be considered Child Ballad motifs are these: romance, enchantment, devotion, determination, obsession, jealousy, forbidden love, insanity, hallucination, uncertainty of one's sanity, the ease with which the truth can be suppressed temporarily, supernatural experiences, supernatural deeds, half-human creatures, teenagers, family strife, the boldness of outlaws, abuse of authority, betting, lust, death, karma, punishment, sin, morality, vanity, folly, dignity, nobility, honor, loyalty, dishonor, riddles, historical events, omens, fate, trust, shock, deception, disguise, treachery, disappointment, revenge, violence, murder, cruelty, combat, courage, escape, exile, rescue, forgiveness, being tested, human weaknesses, and folk heroes.

On one extreme, some Child Ballads recount identifiable historical people, in known events, embellished for dramatic effect. On the other, some differ from fairy tales solely by their being songs and in verse; some have been recast in prose form as fairy tales. A large part of the collection is about Robin Hood; some are about King Arthur. A few of the ballads are rather bawdy.

Modern recordings

Many Child Ballads have subsequently appeared in contemporary music recordings. Burl Ives's 1949 album, The Return of the Wayfaring Stranger, for example, includes two: "Lord Randall" and "The Divil and the Farmer".

In 1956 four albums (consisting of eight LPs) of 72 Child Ballads sung by Ewan MacColl and A.L. Lloyd were released: The English and Scottish Popular Ballads, Vols. 1–4.

In 1960 John Jacob Niles published The Ballad Book of John Jacob Niles, in which he connects folk songs which he collected throughout the southern United States and Appalachia in the early 20th century to the Child Ballads. Many of the songs he published were revived in the Folk music revival, for example "The Riddle Song" ("I gave my love a Cherry"), which he connects with Child No. 1, "Riddles Wisely Expounded".

Joan Baez sang ten Child ballads distributed among her first five albums, the liner notes of which identified them as such.

Loreena McKennitt performs Child ballad 170 The Death of Queen Jane on her album The Wind that Shakes the Barley recorded in 2010, and Child ballad 239 Annachie Gordon on her album Parallel Dreams in 1989.

British folk rock groups such as Fairport Convention, Pentangle and Steeleye Span drew heavily on the Child Ballads in their repertoires, and many other recording artists have recorded individual ballads. Harry Smith included a number of them into his Anthology of American Folk Music.

A rendition of child ballad 155 ("Fatal Flower Garden") appears on Andrew Bird's The Swimming Hour.

In 2003 English folk singer June Tabor recorded the album An Echo of Hooves consisting entirely of Child ballads (210, 212, 161, 195, 191, 106, 74, 215, 88, 20, 58).

Child ballad 95, The Maid Freed from the Gallows has appeared in several recordings of blues and rock bands, notably by Lead Belly as "Gallis Pole" and on the album Led Zeppelin III under the name "Gallows Pole."

Child ballads also occasionally occur in the work of musical groups not usually associated with folk material, such as Ween's recording of "The Unquiet Grave" (Child 78) under the title "Cold Blows the Wind" and versions of "Barbara Allen" (Child 84) recorded by the Everly Brothers, Art Garfunkel, and (on the soundtrack of the 2004 film A Love Song for Bobby Long) John Travolta. In 2009, Fleet Foxes included "The Fause Knight Upon the Road" as the b-side to the 7" release of "Mykonos" (as "False Knight on the Road"). In 2013 US singer-songwriter Anaïs Mitchell and Jefferson Hamer released Child Ballads comprising seven songs from the Francis James Child collection and in 2014 American folksinger Martyn Wylde released eight of the Ballads on his album The Child Ballads, Volume 1.

Child Ballads are also referenced heavily in James A. Michener's novel The Drifters.

Virginia Woolf references Child Ballad number 173 "Mary Hamilton" in A Room of One's Own.

Print and electronic editions of Child's two collections
The two collections have about 200 ballads in common.  Each of the two collections includes about a hundred ballads that the other does not.

Digitisations of The English and Scottish Popular Ballads (1882–98)

Volume 1
 Part 1, ballads 1–28
 Part 2, ballads 29–53

Volume 2
 Part 3, ballads 54–82
 Part 4, ballads 83–113; another scan of part 4

Volume 3
 Part 5, ballads 114–155
 Part 6, ballads 156–188

Volume 4
 Part 7, ballads 189–225
 Part 8, ballads 226–265

Volume 5
 Part 9, ballads 266–305; another scan of part 9
 Part 10 (glossary, ballad airs, bibliography, etc)
 "Volume 5" (slightly later 2 volumes in one edition, has "Additions and Corrections" Section containing alternate versions not in earliest Part 10 edition)

All the variants contained in Child's edition are digitised, without apparatus, at http://www.sacred-texts.com/neu/eng/child/ and http://www.peterrobins.co.uk/ballads/.

Digitisations of English and Scottish ballads (1860)
Volume 1; 
Volume 2; 
Volume 3; 
Volume 4; 
Volume 5; 
Volume 6; 
Volume 7; 
Volume 8.

Tunes in print and electronic editions
 Child's 1882–1898 publication includes, in its final volume's second half, 55 music scores for 46 (of the 305) ballads. 
 
 Bronson, Bertrand Harris. The Singing Tradition of Child's Popular Ballads (Princeton, New Jersey: Princeton University Press, 1976. Northfield, Minnesota: Loomis House Press, 2009 reissue)
 The Traditional Tunes of the Child Ballads: Digital Edition (New York: Camsco Music, 2009) is a CD-R of a scan of Bronson's above-listed four-volume publication.

See also
 List of the Child Ballads
 Border ballad
 List of folk song collections
 Roud Folk Song Index
 List of folk songs by Roud number
 English Folk Dance and Song Society
 Mudcat Café

References

Further reading

 Würzbach, Natascha and Salz, Simone M. Motif Index of the Child Corpus: The English and Scottish Popular Ballad. Translated by Gayna Walls (Berlin and New York: de Gruyter, 1995). Alphabetical list of 163 motifs that cites the ballads in which each one occurs. 
 Cheesman, Tom and Rieuwerts, Sigrid, eds. Ballads into Books: The Legacies of F.J. Child (Bern: Peter Lang, 1997). Twenty-one of the papers presented at the 26th International Ballad Conference (1996, Swansea, Wales)
 Atkinson, David. "A Child Ballad Study Guide with Select Bibliography and Discography" in the above-listed Ballads into Books: The Legacies of F.J. Child. This is a survey of academic research– not a guide for reading lyrics. But many of the articles in its bibliography are interpretations of an individual ballad.
 Bronson, Bertrand Harris. The Ballad as Song (Berkeley and Los Angeles: University of California Press, 1969). Eighteen essays, first published between 1940 and 1968, on the music and singing of the Child Ballads and related topics, written by the compiler of four thousand Child Ballad tunes

External links

 Amateur audio of amateur solo singing of Child ballads, mostly unaccompanied, from 1956 to 1976 in Arkansas, Missouri and thereabouts: 137 recordings of 43 ballads by 69 singers, with each recording's version of the lyrics displayed on that recording's webpage. The Max Hunter Folk Song Collection of the Ozark Mountains
 The title of each version of each Child ballad, listed under Child's index number (one of 1 through 305) for that ballad; all 305 lists in one list. Each version's title is the one given in The English and Scottish Popular Ballads, which was the title given by the source (published, manuscript or oral) from which Child received that version. Each title in this list is a link to the lyrics (in The English and Scottish Popular Ballads) of that version. Child's commentary on each ballad is omitted. The University of Sydney's English Poetry Fulltext Database
 Concordance to the Child ballads. An alphabetical list of every word in the ballads, showing (and citing the source of) the few words before and after every occurrence of it in any of the ballads. To use the concordance on a Macintosh computer, its four PDF files need to be downloaded to a Windows PC, then de-compressed on a Windows PC and then copied to a Macintosh. Cathy Lynn Preston
 Lists of Child's research materials (his correspondence and other archived papers) for his two ballad collections. Harvard University's Houghton Library

 
 
Ballad collections
 
 
 
British poetry